Sir Aubrey (Hunt) de Vere, 2nd Baronet (28 August 1788 – 5 July 1846) was an Anglo-Irish poet and landowner.

De Vere was the son of Sir Vere Hunt, 1st Baronet and Eleanor Pery, daughter of William Pery, 1st Baron Glentworth and his first wife Jane Walcott. He was educated at Harrow School, where he was a childhood friend of Lord Byron, and Trinity College, Dublin. He married Mary Spring Rice, the daughter of Stephen Edward Rice and Catherine Spring, and sister of Thomas Spring Rice, 1st Baron Monteagle of Brandon, in 1807. He succeeded to his father's title in 1818. He and Mary had five sons, including the third and fourth baronets, Aubrey and Stephen de Vere, and the poet Aubrey Thomas de Vere, and three daughters, two of whom died in infancy.

The Hunt/de Vere family estate for 300 years (1657–1957), including the period of the de Vere Baronetcy of Curragh, is the present-day Curraghchase Forest Park, in County Limerick. De Vere spent most of his life on the estate and was closely involved in its management. He suffered much trouble from his ownership of the island of Lundy, which his father, who was a notoriously poor businessman, had unwisely purchased in 1802, and which became a heavy drain on the family's finances. Sir Vere was never able to find a purchaser for Lundy, and it took his son until 1834 (or 1830) to dispose of it.

Sir Aubrey stood for election in the 1820 General Election and came in third with 2921 votes.

He changed his surname from Hunt to de Vere on 15 March 1832, in reference to his Earl of Oxford ancestors, dating back to Aubrey de Vere I, a tenant-in-chief in England of William the Conqueror in 1086. He served as High Sheriff of County Limerick in 1811.

Sir Aubrey was a poet. Wordsworth called his sonnets the most perfect of the age. These and his drama, Mary Tudor: An Historical Drama, were published by his son the poet Mr. Aubrey Thomas de Vere in 1875 and 1884.

Works
De Vere produced numerous works over his lifetime. The most notable are: Ode to the Duchess of Angouleme (1815), Julian the Apostate: A Dramatic Poem (1822), The Duke of Mercia: An Historical Drama [with] The Lamentation of Ireland, and Other Poems (1823), A Song of Faith: Devout Exercises and Sonnets and his most famous work, Mary Tudor: An Historical Drama.

References

External links

 
 

1788 births
1846 deaths
Alumni of Trinity College Dublin
19th-century Anglo-Irish people
Baronets in the Baronetage of Ireland
Aubrey
High Sheriffs of County Limerick
Irish poets
People educated at Harrow School
Writers from County Limerick
Sonneteers
Nobility from County Limerick